Bourassa is a former provincial electoral district in Quebec, Canada.

It included part of the city and later borough of Montréal-Nord.

It was created for the 1966 election from part of Bourget electoral district.  Its last election was in 1998.  It disappeared in the 2003 election.  Its successor electoral districts were Bourassa-Sauvé (formed by merging part of Bourassa with all of Sauvé electoral district) and Crémazie.

It was named after nationalist politician Henri Bourassa, who was a member of the Legislative Assembly of Quebec from 1907 to 1912 and also served in the House of Commons of Canada.

Members of the Legislative Assembly / National Assembly

Electoral history (incomplete)

External links
Election results
 Election results (National Assembly)
Election results (QuebecPolitique.com)
Maps
1992–2001 changes (Flash)

Former provincial electoral districts of Quebec
Montréal-Nord
Constituencies established in 1965
Constituencies disestablished in 2001
1965 establishments in Quebec
2001 disestablishments in Quebec